The Chicago Slovaks were a Chicago soccer team that was based in Berwyn, Illinois. They were the 1941 winners of the Kelley Cup. I. 1942 and 1951 the Chicago Slovaks won the Peter J. Peel Challenge Cup. They tied with the Vikings for the Peel cup in 1943. They participated in the National Soccer League and won in 1951, 1952, and 1954. Some of their players during that time were Pete Matevich, who earned 4 caps for the United States men's national soccer team, Bill Conterio, who was a member of the United States soccer team at the 1952 and 1956 Summer Olympics, and also Gino Gardassanich, who played for multiple clubs in Croatia, and also earned 6 caps with the United States men's national soccer team

Another high point for the Chicago Slovaks was in 1970 when they made it all the way to the semifinals of the 1970 US Open Cup, which is the oldest and most prestigious tournament in the United States to this day.

The Slovak Athletic Association is now the current form of the Slovaks, which is a club for Slovak-Americans living in the Chicago area that still nominates old players to the Illinois Soccer Hall of Fame to this day, however the club announced in July 2019 that it will be folding at the end of 2019 after 94 years in existence.

References 

Soccer clubs in Chicago
European-American culture in Chicago
Slovak-American history
http://homepages.sover.net/~spectrum/peelcup.html